Sayram is a district of Turkistan Region in southern Kazakhstan. The historic city of Sayram is located in this district, and gives it its name. Population:

References

Districts of Kazakhstan
Turkistan Region